Proevce is a village in the municipality of Kumanovo, North Macedonia.

Demographics
According to the 2002 census, the village had a total of 2311 inhabitants. Ethnic groups in the village include:

Macedonians 2218
Serbs 73
Romani 18
Others 2

References

External links

Villages in Kumanovo Municipality